Île aux Chevaux is an island in Saint Pierre and Miquelon, a French territory off the southern coast of Newfoundland, Canada.

Location 
Île aux Chevaux is in the north end of the Grand Barachois, a lagoon between the islands of Le Cap and Miquelon, fewer than 100 meters off the southern shores of the latter.

See also
Geography of Saint Pierre and Miquelon
List of Saint Pierre and Miquelon-related topics

References

Islands of Saint Pierre and Miquelon